Kenneth Davenport Knowles (9 March 1874 – 9 December 1944) was a priest of the Church of England. He was the Archdeacon of Huntingdon from 1921 to 1943.

Knowles was educated at The King's School, Canterbury, at Bedford School, and at Worcester College, Oxford. He was admitted as a solicitor in 1900 before entering Ely Theological College in 1905. He was ordained the following year and his first curacy was at Ramsey, Huntingdonshire after which he was Rector of Woodwalton. He was a temporary chaplain to the British Armed Forces during World War I. Later he was Rector of Brampton, then Upton and finally Diddington.

References

1874 births
People educated at The King's School, Canterbury
People educated at Bedford School
Alumni of Worcester College, Oxford
Alumni of Ely Theological College
English solicitors
English military chaplains
Archdeacons of Huntingdon
1944 deaths
World War I chaplains